Andrew Baines Bernard is a fictional character portrayed by Ed Helms in the NBC comedy television series The Office. He is introduced in Season 3 of the show when Jim Halpert transfers to the Stamford branch, where Andy is initially employed. Ultimately, the Stamford branch merges with the Scranton branch later in the season, leading to Andy and other employees to transfer to Scranton. 

Although Helms received praise for his performance, the character received a mixed reception. Andy was named one of the most annoying TV characters of 2011 by Vulture. In contrast, Nerve ranked him the second funniest character on the series, behind only Michael Scott. In the final season, Alan Sepinwall of Uproxx described Andy's personality as a "malevolent version of Michael Scott", while Erik Adams of The A.V. Club wrote "no amount of last-minute humanizing can win the audience back to [Andy's] side."

Storylines

Season 3

Andy is introduced in the Season 3 premiere as the Regional Director in Charge of Sales at the Stamford branch, where Jim had transferred to. Following the closure of the Stamford branch and the merger with Scranton, Andy attempts to gain favor with manager Michael Scott and has a brief rivalry with co-worker Dwight Schrute. Though Michael initially takes a liking to Andy, he soon becomes agitated at Andy's sycophantic attitude and poor salesmanship. 

When Andy's behavior begins to irritate the office staff, Jim plays a prank on Andy by hiding his cell phone in the ceiling and repeatedly calling it. The phone's ringtone is Andy's rendition of "Rockin' Robin". Andy becomes increasingly agitated each time the phone rings, and eventually punches a hole in the office wall out of frustration. Andy is subsequently sent to anger management by corporate.

Later in the season, Andy returns from anger management and accompanies Jim to meet with clients from a local high school. He unexpectedly runs into his girlfriend at the school, and is horrified to discover she is a high school student.

During the penultimate episode of the season, "Beach Games", Andy captains a team alongside Jim, Dwight and Stanley Hudson in a competition for Michael's selection of the next Regional Manager of the Scranton branch, as Michael believes he is a shoo-in for a position at corporate. However, he is sabotaged by Angela Martin, who favors Dwight. When Dwight is pre-emptively named Regional Manager by Michael (who is confident that he will receive the promotion), Andy is named Assistant Regional Manager. This never comes to fruition, as Michael does not receive the corporate promotion.

Season 4-5
With the departure of Karen Filippelli, Andy becomes the only salesman from Stamford aside from Jim to stay at the Scranton branch. He develops a friendship with Dwight, and, unaware of Dwight and Angela's previous romantic interludes, romantic interest in Angela. He steals an elaborate ice sculpture for Angela's launch party and serenades her with a rendition of the ABBA song "Take a Chance on Me", receiving a rare smile in return. He finally wins Angela over by gifting her a cat and a sentimental note. Angela and Andy's relationship sends Dwight spiraling into crushing depression, and rekindles his dislike for Andy.

In "Goodbye, Toby", Andy proposes to Angela (unbeknownst to him, at the same moment Jim had been preparing to propose to Pam) with a ring that he has carried in his wallet for six years. Angela accepts his proposal with an irritated "Okay". Shortly after the proposal, however, Angela has sex with Dwight in the office, which is witnessed by Phyllis and the camera crew.

At the start of season 5 Andy is still unaware of Angela and Dwight's affair, and he begins planning the wedding. His ideas are often rejected, and Angela eventually manipulates Andy into having the wedding take place at Dwight's farm. During the office Christmas party, Phyllis reveals Angela and Dwight's affair to the staff. The office staff neglect to inform Andy, however, which leads Michael to tell Andy the truth. Angela reluctantly confirms the affair occurred, though she tells Andy that she loves him. Andy later confronts Dwight and challenges him to a duel. They meet out in the parking lot, where Dwight realizes that Angela has had sex with Andy as well, despite telling Dwight that she had only been sleeping with him. Realizing that they have both been lied to, Andy cancels his wedding cake, and Dwight throws out the bobblehead in his likeness, implying the men's relationships with Angela are now over.

Angela's affair with Dwight and the broken engagement affect Andy's perspective on relationships. When Kevin seeks dating advice from others in the office, Andy gives him romantic advice that appears to reflect his own experiences with Angela -- telling him to never give compliments, push for physical contact, or be assertive to the point of rudeness. In "Heavy Competition", Andy offers bargain deals for Jim and Pam's wedding, and he mistakes Pam's rejection of Jim's ideas as Pam controlling him. Andy assumes the role of Jim's emotional rock, which Jim goes along with as a prank. After realizing Jim is messing with him, Andy confronts him. Jim tells Andy that he is very happy with Pam, and while Andy's breakup with Angela was "a bummer", he assures Andy that he will find someone else in the future.

Season 6-7
As season 6 starts, Andy develops a friendship and an attraction to Erin, who is the new office secretary, but the pair are both too timid to reveal their feelings for one another. In "Secret Santa", Andy asks to be Erin's Secret Santa, and proceeds to give Erin gifts resembling the Twelve Days of Christmas. To complete his Secret Santa gift, Andy hires 12 professional drummers to perform for Erin and the rest of the staff in the parking lot; Erin is visibly pleased by the gesture. In "The Delivery," Michael arranges a date between Erin and Kevin. This pushes Andy to finally ask Erin out, which she accepts.

In "Secretary's Day", Andy wants to ensure that Erin has a memorable Secretary's Day, and asks a reluctant Michael to treat Erin out to lunch. During lunch, Michael reveals that Andy was engaged to Angela, a fact that Andy had concealed from Erin to Michael's surprise. Returning to the office, Erin enters the main party, throws cake in Andy's face, and reveals her knowledge about his previous engagement with Angela. Deciding she cannot trust Andy, Erin breaks up with him, which leaves Andy distraught.

During "The Cover-Up", Andy receives a call from a client claiming that their Sabre printer caught fire during a routine operation. In order to confirm his suspicions, Andy investigates and discovers that the Sabre printer indeed catches fire; he manages to record the incident on video. When the press gets word of the Sabre printers catching fire, the company's CEO Jo Bennett (Kathy Bates) goes out of her way to find the culprit. Andy initially denies sending the video, but eventually comes clean, admitting to submitting a letter and the video to a news editor. Though Andy is harassed by the sales staff over the report, he is commended by Erin for his bravery, leaving him pleased.

In Season 7, Erin begins a romantic relationship with Gabe, devastating Andy. However, as the season continues, Erin gradually begins to lose interest in Gabe, eventually confiding in Michael that she may be in love with Andy again. After Erin publicly breaks up with Gabe in front of the staff, Gabe becomes venomously angry toward Andy, wrongly believing Andy had triggered Erin's brutal public breakup with him. In "Dwight K. Schrute, (Acting) Manager", Gabe breaks down and, crying, makes Andy promise not to date Erin, to which an uncomfortable Andy agrees. However, when Gabe tells Erin what Andy said about them not dating, Andy shuts Gabe up by pointing out Gabe's crying fit to Erin.

In "Search Committee", Andy interviews to replace Michael's initial replacement, Deangelo, as the regional manager, which Gabe tries to sabotage. However, Andy remains a managerial candidate once Gabe's behavior gets him transferred out of Scranton. Erin asks Andy out on a date, and he eventually refuses, claiming that he has gotten over her. However, Andy later tells the camera that he thinks Erin is great.

Season 8
During Season 8, Robert California, selected by the search committee, declines to become Branch Manager and convinces Jo Bennett to give him her position as CEO, thus giving Robert the authority to appoint Andy as the new manager. Upon discovering a list that divides the office into winners and losers, and being moved into the loser section after questioning Robert about it, he retaliates by hosting a pizza party for the losers and publicly confronts Robert about the positive attributes of the losers. This act earns the respect of Robert and the office. Robert eventually reveals that Andy's selection as the Regional Manager was done because he's a "simple underdog whom people will rally behind."

In "The Incentive", Robert California urges the doubling of sales growth, which Andy attempts to fulfill with an incentive program. This program spirals out of control when Andy offers a tattoo on his posterior as one of the prizes, worth 5,000 points. In comedic fashion, the office pools their points and succeeds in winning this prize. Andy bravely steps up, only for the office to change the originally more-raunchy tattoo design to one that honors Andy's nickname of "The Nard Dog."

During "Garden Party", Andy throws a garden party to impress Robert with his parents Walter Sr. (Stephen Collins), Ellen (Dee Wallace), and younger brother Walter, Jr. (Josh Groban) in attendance. However, Andy is also trying to prove himself to his parents, who were under the impression that he was the CEO of the company. Andy goes to great lengths to try and impress his parents, which leads Walter, Sr. to later speak with Andy. He insults Andy's job and states Andy needs to stop seeking his approval like a little kid. This conversation is overheard by some of the office staff, prompting everyone to understand why Andy feels the need to get everyone to like him. Following the garden party, a dejected Andy plans to head home himself, but Darryl and Oscar decide to cheer him up with an impromptu barbecue.

In "Christmas Wishes", Andy introduces his new girlfriend Jessica to the office staff, much to the chagrin of Erin. During the office Christmas party, Erin drunkenly tells Andy that her Christmas wish is for Jessica to die, offending and angering Andy. He tells Erin to get over the fact that he turned her down for a date and storms off. Later, during the party, Andy becomes concerned when Erin gets a ride home from Robert. While driving Meredith home, Andy follows Robert to Erin's apartment, but to his relief, he sees Robert hug Erin goodbye with comforting words and instructs her to take care of her hangover.

Seemingly despondent over his impending divorce, Robert hosts an impromptu "Pool Party" at his soon-to-be-sold mansion. The staff attends with Andy and Jessica, much to Erin's consternation. Andy carries around his parents' engagement ring, claiming that his parents fell in love with Jessica. Desperate for Andy's attention, Erin and Dwight engage in a series of competitive pool games with Andy and Jessica. Later on, Andy accidentally loses the ring and frantically searches for it; Erin recovers the ring in the pool and gives it to Andy, knowing the history behind the ring. Andy confides to Erin that he's confused about his relationship with Jessica, which gives Erin hope.

In "Last Day in Florida", Andy learns that Erin isn't coming back to Scranton and realizes he still loves her. He decides to go to Florida to win her back. The two get back together, and Andy breaks up with Jessica. Returning to Scranton, Andy discovers that Nellie Bertram, one of the initial interviewees for Regional Manager, has claimed Andy's manager position at Scranton, with Andy subsequently demoted to a salesman. In a deliberate callback to his outburst in Season 3, Andy punches a hole in the office wall and gets fired from Dunder Mifflin.

In "Turf War", Andy manages to win a major client and uses it as leverage to get David Wallace to purchase Dunder Mifflin. He also calls Robert and threatens to get him fired if David buys the company. Wallace ultimately buys back Dunder Mifflin, fires Nellie and Robert, and reinstates Andy as manager. While Andy is reinstated, Robert swindles his way into getting a million dollars from David, while Andy hires Nellie out of guilt and sorrow.

Season 9
In the final season's premiere, it is revealed that Andy was sent to Outward Bound manager training by David Wallace, which caused him to revert to his previous cockier and meaner persona. Wanting revenge on Nellie, he continues to torment her. When she needs an employer's signature to verify her employment at an adoption agency, he refuses in front of the entire office, upsetting her and Erin. Andy later finds Erin crying after this, which prompts him to sign Nellie's papers.

Andy discovers his father has abandoned their family, leaving them nearly penniless. He consults with Oscar and Darryl to sell enough family assets for his mother to live. They urge Andy to sell their family boat, which Andy had always wanted to drive; Andy relents and sells it to a dealer in the Bahamas. After he and Erin drive to Connecticut to see off the boat themselves, Andy discovers Walter Jr. disheveled and hung over in one of the cabins. Andy decides to sail the boat to the Bahamas himself with Walter Jr., leaving Erin behind. Though grateful to Erin for cheering him up, he doesn't notice how hurt she is at being left behind. Upon arriving in the Bahamas, Andy decides to stay for several more weeks. This upsets Erin greatly and causes her to become closer to her friend and co-worker Pete Miller.

After three months, Andy returns from the Bahamas in the episode "The Boat" and immediately alienates the staff with his behavior: ignorantly expecting the staff to take him seriously as if he never left, voiding a major sale that Dwight had with Jan Levinson, and shamelessly collecting his paychecks plus the "merit bonus" he acquired for the staff excelling their sales quota. He holds a meeting with the staff to catch up on what he missed, so as to meet with David Wallace, who has been under the impression that Andy has been at the office the entire time via phone calls and e-mails. Andy ultimately manages to get through the meeting without repercussions. Erin, feeling neglected by Andy, dumps Andy for mistreating her and for leaving her alone for three months; the conversation is heard by David Wallace on speakerphone.

Distraught over their breakup, Andy's professional relationship with Erin and the rest of the staff worsens. Wallace chastises Andy but allows him to keep his job. After discovering that Pete is dating Erin, Andy impulsively fires Pete, but Toby tells Andy that he can't fire Pete over a personal grudge. When Erin and Pete lecture Andy, telling him that he needs to move on, Andy decides to hire their exes at the branch, in a bid to make Erin and Pete uncomfortable. The ploy works, and Erin and Pete's past relationship issues surface. Andy smugly states that seeing Erin and Pete unhappy has made him feel better.

As in-universe promos start to circulate for the documentary series about the branch, Andy comes to realize that he's disillusioned about his job, and meets with real estate/talent agent Carla Fern (Roseanne Barr), who takes Andy on as a client. Andy pays her $5,000 to sign with her agency, and he books his first job in an industrial film about a chemical lab. Inspired to finally follow his dreams, Andy takes drastic measures to get fired, including initiating an ugly argument with David Wallace. Irritated by Andy's actions, David becomes enraged and fires Andy; Andy returns to the office to say goodbye, and performs a moving rendition of Sarah McLachlan's song "I Will Remember You". Surprised by Andy's performance, the staff embrace Andy and say goodbye, convinced that he may have some talent after all. In "A.A.R.M.", Andy auditions for a singing reality TV show, but is asked to leave before his audition due to overcrowding. Enraged, Andy bursts into the audition room, demands the judges let him audition, and throws a crying tantrum.

In the series finale, Andy found a job at Cornell University's Admissions Office. The video of Andy's tantrum has become viral on YouTube, inspiring a parody on "Saturday Night Live". Andy's confidence and ease around everyone increase when he stunningly realizes that most of the crowd at the documentary reunion panel are not only there to see him, but are genuine fans of his portrayal on the show. Returning to the office after Dwight and Angela's wedding, Andy's former co-workers watch his Cornell speech and are unanimously impressed by it; Andy nearly breaks into tears as he tells the camera, "I wish there was a way to know you're in the good old days before you've actually left them".

Relationships

Erin Hannon

In season 6, Andy takes an interest in receptionist Erin Hannon, who has mutual affection, but due to miscommunication, there was a long period where the two waited for each other to make a move. However, Andy eventually asks Erin out on a date, and she graciously accepts. Three weeks later, after Erin discovers, through Michael Scott, of Andy's former engagement to accountant Angela Martin, she throws cake in Andy's face and decides that they need to take a break from one another. Over a year later, Erin, after breaking up with Gabe Lewis, asks Andy out on a date, but he dismisses her advances, because of his lingering issues with her leaving him for Gabe. When Andy introduces his girlfriend Jessica to the Office at a Christmas party, Erin becomes drunk and confesses to Andy that she wishes Jessica was dead. Greatly offended, Andy informs Erin that she needs to get over their break-up, and briskly leaves. Upon learning that Erin wishes to live in Tallahassee, Florida, Andy drives to Tallahassee to get back together with Erin. At first, he is unsuccessful, but ultimately gets her back; they make up and kiss in the middle of the street. During season 9, their relationship starts to show cracks as Andy comes back from a training seminar that has made him more confident, but seemingly more selfish to Erin. When Andy takes his parents' boat to the Bahamas for three weeks, he leaves Erin behind, who looks on disappointed. Erin later goes out with Pete, a new co-worker for drinks. When Andy decides to stay in the Bahamas for three more months, Erin becomes increasingly unhappy, and finally breaks up with Andy upon his return. Later in the season, Andy's distraught behavior affects his professional relationship with Erin and the staff. When Andy learns of Erin's relationship with Pete, he acts irrationally to where Erin and Pete lecture him that he needs to move on. In the episode Livin' the Dream, Andy and Erin are seen speaking pleasantly to each other; Erin admits her concern for Andy's well-being, saying she's worried he'll "be homeless or even starve." During Andy's goodbye song, Erin stares at Andy with a serious look of affection, making it unclear whether or not the two still have romantic feelings for each other. In the series finale, Andy, Erin, and Pete are all shown to be getting along well at the after-party, indicating the tensions from earlier have eased.

Angela Martin
In the fourth season, Andy begins a relationship with accountant Angela Martin, who half-heartedly began dating him on the rebound, after she had broken up with Dwight Schrute (whose relationship with her had been unknown to the majority of the staff). After dating for about seven months, Andy proposes to Angela during Toby Flenderson's farewell party, and she begrudgingly accepts. However, during their engagement, she resumes her affair with Dwight. Andy endures tremendous effort in order to prepare for Angela's dream wedding. Upon learning about the affair, both he and Dwight break up with her, and Andy is initially crushed. When Andy is leaving the office for good after he quits to seek fame, Angela tries to talk him out of it. Andy wrongly assumes she regrets ending their relationship, and says he does think about her often, but Angela is able to choke back her disgust and they part ways with a hug.

Michael Scott
After transferring to the Scranton branch, Andy has a strategy to become the number two of the branch by name repetition, personality mirroring, and never breaking off a handshake first; Michael immediately likes him. In "Traveling Salesmen", Andy picks Michael as his traveling salesman partner, and during the car ride, Michael tells Andy about Dwight going behind his back and talking to Jan. When they do their joint sale pitch, Andy ruins the pitch, infuriating Michael. Andy finds the toll booth receipt that shows Dwight went to New York, and suggests that he wanted to talk with Jan again, resulting in Michael confronting Dwight; Dwight quits Dunder Muffin. In "The Return", Michael talks to Jim about Andy; Jim tells Michael that Andy is a yes man, and did the same thing with his old boss, Josh, at the Stamford branch. After Angela tells Michael why Dwight went to New York, Michael decides to leave the office to get Dwight back. Andy tries to come with him and begins telling Michael about his weekend plans for the two of them. Finally, Michael tells him to stop, realizing he made a mistake trying to replace Dwight with Andy. Following Andy's return from anger management, Michael gives him a second chance, naming him a team captain for the beach games competition and considering him as a potential replacement. For the remainder of the series, Michael is on good terms with Andy, and when Michael leaves Dunder Mifflin for Colorado, he gifts Andy all of his clients as a way of motivating him. Although he initially loses one of those clients, Andy's ability to maintain a relationship with the others greatly boosts his confidence.

Dwight Schrute
Since Andy's arrival, he and Dwight had a competitive professional relationship, and the two eventually duel over Angela when it is found she is cheating on Andy with Dwight. After the fight, both relationships end, and Angela is left heartbroken and alone. A few months later, the two soon begin competing for Erin's attention, but Dwight ultimately decides to cease pursuing her in order to maintain a good relationship with Andy. However, after Andy is hired as Regional Manager, Andy makes Dwight his "Enforcer" in order to stay on good terms, but Dwight later states in an interview that he will "wait for Andy's inevitable demise". During "Couples Discount", Dwight is unable to get Andy's sign-off on prices with a major sale that Dwight landed, although when Andy suddenly reappears, he chastises Dwight for not having his approval on the prices. When Dwight informs him that Andy was on a boat and unreachable, Andy tries again to maintain his authority. This backfires when Andy decides to renege on the prices with Dwight's client, thus voiding a major sale for the company and wrecking Dwight's sales record. Dwight later tells false stories to Andy when Andy asks for an update on the branch, in hopes of sabotaging Andy. When Dwight learns he's in line to become the permanent branch manager and Andy asks if his plan to quit and seek stardom is a good idea, Dwight kindly but firmly tells Andy that he should not quit, even if this denies Dwight his dream job. In the series finale, Andy returns to Scranton to attend Dwight and Angela's wedding.

Jim and Pam Halpert
Andy was the subject of many pranks by Jim and Pam, some of which have caused his anger issues to unfold. Andy also had a romantic interest in Pam, but due to intentionally misleading advice given to him by Jim, it did not develop into a relationship. Although the two will, at times, act considerably mean to Andy, Jim and Pam are often pleasant to him, and even give him advice when he needs it. When Andy goes through a rough breakup, he gives Jim wildly bad advice when he suspects Pam of controlling him. However, Jim uses it as an opportunity to prank Andy throughout the day before he sees through the ruse, prompting Jim to comfort him about finding someone else.

Darryl Philbin
Initially, Darryl and Andy were foes. Darryl states that Andy once used him as a scapegoat, nearly getting him fired from his job, for a mistake that Andy had made. Andy also attempts to order Darryl around when Sabre's "Sales is King" policy greatly affects the sales staffs' egos. However, over time, the two develop a strong friendship. When Darryl confides in Andy that he wished he had remained a member of the warehouse staff, Andy convinces him to make the most of his position and continue rising in the company. When Darryl is depressed over not winning a lottery that the warehouse staff won and shared, he demands that Andy either terminate him or give him the Manager position. Andy is blunt, but kind, as he informs Darryl the truth about his shortcomings, and Darryl subsequently rededicates himself to his job. When he meets Andy's family, Darryl overhears Andy's father berate him over his status in life, and finally understands why Andy needs to please others, and later participates in cheering Andy up, along with the rest of the staff. Darryl is also one of the few people in the office, along with Jim, Pam and Erin, who did not accept Nellie Bertram's attempt at usurping Andy's job. Darryl is not impressed with Andy's acting ability, to the point of bluntly saying Andy needs to have a job that will tolerate his inevitable and chronic mistakes. In the series finale, Darryl initially avoids Andy, but impressed with Andy's speech at Cornell, he gives Andy a hug.

Gabe Lewis
While initially having a neutral relationship with Gabe, Andy develops a dislike for Gabe when he begins dating Erin. After Erin breaks up with Gabe, a heartbroken and jealous Gabe begins to heavily resent Andy and threatens him not to make any advances on Erin. When Andy interviews for the Regional Manager position, Gabe displays a negative, biased opinion of him. Later, he unsuccessfully attempts to convince the CEO of Sabre, Jo Bennett, not to hire Andy as Manager. For the next year (until Gabe is written out), Andy and Gabe are generally rivals, often making snide remarks to one another. After Erin breaks up with Andy, Andy briefly hires Gabe to make Erin feel uncomfortable.

Robert California
After becoming the new CEO of Sabre, Robert California appointed Andy as Regional Manager of the Scranton branch. Since then, Andy has developed an awkward relationship with Robert, who he is eager to impress, and highly intimidated by. Robert states that the reason he chose Andy for the Manager position is because he is "All surface... Uncomplicated, what you see is what you get". Andy and Robert's contentious relationship climaxes when Robert allows Nellie Bertram to usurp Andy's Regional Manager position, and Andy is fired for refusing to accept Nellie as manager, only able to reclaim his managerial role by convincing David Wallace to purchase Dunder Mifflin away from Sabre and Robert.

Behind the scenes
The character is named after American economist Andrew Bernard, professor of international economics at the Tuck School of Business at Dartmouth College. While Andy was initially meant as a temporary character in season 3 of The Office, the character "grew" on Greg Daniels and the writers, and they decided to have Andy return to the office from anger management and become a permanent character.

Reception
Initially considered an abrasive addition to the show, Andy Bernard later became a fan favorite due to his character development throughout the series. Fans did not enjoy his arc in the final season, which saw Andy revert to his worst tendencies in his early seasons and treat his coworkers poorly, with some commentators wondering if the show's writers "did not know what to do" with the character.

References

External links
 Entertainment Weekly- Ed Helms No Longer an 'Office' Temp

The Office (American TV series) characters
Fictional characters from Connecticut
Fictional salespeople
Fictional musicians
Fictional dancers
Television characters introduced in 2006
Fictional managers
American male characters in television